Osaka is a Census-designated place and coal town located in Wise County, Virginia, United States, served by a (now vanished) branch line of the Appalachia to Stonega railroad that ran along Mud Lick Creek to Roda, which was built in 1896 by Interstate Railroads.

References

bibliography

 
 
 

Unincorporated communities in Wise County, Virginia
Unincorporated communities in Virginia
Census-designated places in Wise County, Virginia
Census-designated places in Virginia
Coal towns in Virginia